FC Nordstern Basel is a football team from Basel, Switzerland. Currently playing in the Swiss 8th division, FC Nordstern Basel has spent 35 seasons in the Swiss top flight, last in 1982. They were runners-up in the Swiss league in 1924, 1927, and 1928.

History
Nordstern Basel was founded in 1901.

In the 1970s, the club experienced a revival after hiring player-coach Zvezdan Cebinac. Cebinac led Nordstern back to the Nationalliga A for the first time since the 1940s.

References

External links
 http://www.fcnordstern.ch/  Official Website.

Association football clubs established in 1901
Football clubs in Switzerland
FC Nordstern Basel